The Steigen Tunnel is a road tunnel in Nordland county, Norway. The tunnel begins at the village of Tømmerneset in Hamarøy and heads northwest through the Veggfjellan mountain to the northwest, exiting the mountain at the Forsan farm.

The tunnel was completed in 1990 and from 1990 until 2005, it was the longest road tunnel in Nordland county.  The Steigen Tunnel gave Steigen municipality a ferry-free road connection. The tunnel replaced the ferries between Skutvika and Leirvikbogen and between Røsvika and Nordfold.

Like many other tunnels in Norway, the Steigen Tunnel is plagued with condensation problems. The condensation can lead to dangerous situations because car windows will suddenly fog up when one enters the tunnel.

References

Hamarøy
Steigen
Road tunnels in Nordland